McLeod Family Rural Complex is a historic farm and national historic district located near Pine Bluff, Moore County, North Carolina. The district encompasses 10 contributing buildings, 1 contributing site, and 3 contributing structures on a family farm established in the mid-19th century.  It includes two houses: the John McLeod House is a largely intact, 1 1/2-story, frame dogtrot plan house dated to about 1840. The Alex McLeod House was built in 1884, and is a two-story, five bay, traditional frame farmhouse.  Other contributing resources include two tobacco barns, a pack house, fertilizer house, barn with stables, corn crib, saddle-notched log house (c. 1865), chicken house, shed, root cellar, and smokehouse.

It was added to the National Register of Historic Places in 1984.

References

Farms on the National Register of Historic Places in North Carolina
Historic districts on the National Register of Historic Places in North Carolina
Buildings and structures in Moore County, North Carolina
National Register of Historic Places in Moore County, North Carolina